The 2023 World Baseball Classic championship will be the final game of the 2023 World Baseball Classic, the fifth edition of the World Baseball Classic, a men's international baseball tournament sanctioned by the World Baseball Softball Confederation (WBSC) in partnership with Major League Baseball (MLB). The game will be played on March 21, 2023, at LoanDepot Park in Miami, Florida, United States, between hosts and defending champions United States and the winner of the second semifinal.

Background
The United States advanced to the championship by defeating Cuba in the semifinals. Japan and Mexico play on March 20 to determine the second finalist.

Road to the championship

Note: In all results below, the score of the finalist is given first (H: home; A: away).

Game

Details
Boxscore

References

External links
Official website
Results, Rosters & Stats

Championship
World Baseball Classic championship
World Baseball Classic championship
Baseball competitions in Miami
International baseball competitions hosted by the United States
International sports competitions in Florida
World Baseball Classic championship